"Be the One" is a song by American electronica musician Moby. It was released as a single and EP on February 15, 2011 in conjunction with the announcement of his tenth studio album Destroyed.

Release 
The Be the One EP was made available for free as a digital download on Moby's website and contains three tracks from Destroyed.

Reception 
"Be the One" was rated "Track of the Day" by Q on March 7, 2011.

Music videos
All three songs on the EP have a music video self-shot by Moby.

"Be the One" was shot by Moby while flying from New York to Los Angeles and edited by Jo Haggis. The video features an extreme close-up of Moby singing directly into the camera while he is walking around in different locales, and reportedly represents the drudgery of touring.

"Sevastopol" was shot by Moby while flying to Brazil to DJ with Carl Cox.  The video documents the trip with a first-person perspective, including shots of Moby riding in a taxi, flying in a plane, and performing at a show.

"Victoria Lucas" was shot by Moby at night in Los Angeles. The video features black and white shots of the city that move to the music with a kaleidescope-effect.

Track listing
 Digital EP 
"Be the One" – 3:29
"Sevastopol" – 4:21
"Victoria Lucas" – 5:54

Charts

References

External links
 

Moby songs
2011 songs
Songs written by Moby
Mute Records singles